Iraq, despite going through a civil war,  participated in the 2006 Asian Games held in Doha, Qatar.

The country was represented by 86 athletes participating in 17 sports, including football, cue sports, and 
weightlifting. Its last medals at the Asian Games were in 1986 at Seoul, South Korea, where it won five silver and two bronze medals.

Participation details

Boxing

Five boxers represented Iraq in this edition of the Asiad. Three of the five athletes made it to the quarterfinals but none succeeded in pushing through the semifinals, leaving Iraq ranked 15th in boxing.

Entry list
Featherweight - MAHDI Suraka
Flyweight - MUTUSHR Majeed
Light Flyweight - NAJAH Ali 
Light Welterweight - ZUHIR Jabar
Heavyweight - ALI Salman

Results
Venue: ASPIRE Hall 5

Legend:
PTS - Points, Referee Stop Contest, RSCOS - Referee Stop Contest Outscored, 
R - Round 

 The winner was based on the points scored on the third round

Football

Round One

Group B

Round Two

Group E

Quarterfinal

Semi finals

Gold medal match

Iraq wins silver medal

Weightlifting

The 21-year-old Harem Ali earned Iraq its first medal in the 2006 Asian games, as he captured bronze in the Men's 77 kg.

Men's 77Kg
December 4, 18:00
Al-Dana Banquet Hall

Men's 105Kg
December 6, 16:00
Al-Dana Banquet Hall

Men's 105+ Kg
December 6, 19:00
Al-Dana Banquet Hall

References

Nations at the 2006 Asian Games
2006
Asian Games